The midgut is the portion of the embryo from which most of the intestines develop. After it bends around the superior mesenteric artery, it is called the "midgut loop". It comprises the portion of the alimentary canal from the end of the foregut at the opening of the bile duct to the hindgut, about two-thirds of the way through the transverse colon.

In the embryo

During development, the human midgut undergoes a rapid phase of growth in which the loop of midgut herniates outside of the abdominal cavity of the fetus and protrudes into the umbilical cord. This herniation is physiological (occurs normally).

Later in development, the fetus's body catches up in size relative to the midgut and creates adequate room in the abdominal cavity for the entirety of the midgut to reside. The midgut loops slip back out of the umbilical cord and the physiological hernia ceases to exist. This change coincides with the termination of the yolk sac and the counterclockwise rotation of the two limbs of the midgut loop around their combined central axis.

In the adult

Organs in the adult midgut 
 Duodenum (distal half of 2nd part, 3rd and 4th parts)
 Jejunum
 Ileum
 Cecum
 Appendix
 Ascending colon
 Hepatic flexure of colon
 Transverse colon (proximal two-thirds)

Vascular, lymphatics and innervation
Arterial supply to the midgut is from the superior mesenteric artery, an unpaired branch of the aorta. Venous drainage is to the portal venous system. Lymph from the midgut drains to prevertebral superior mesenteric nodes located at the origin of the superior mesenteric artery from the aorta. Portal drainage carries all non-lipid nutrients from digestion to the liver for processing and detoxification, while lymphatic drainage carries fatty chyle to the cisterna chyli. Parasympathetic innervation of the midgut is from the superior mesenteric plexus, while sympathetic innervation is from the lesser splanchnic nerve.

Clinical significance
 Malrotation of the midgut during development can lead to volvulus.
 Pain in the midgut is referred to the region around the belly button

As stated, in development a loop of midgut herniates outside of the abdominal cavity into the umbilical cord. If this persists after birth it is called an omphalocele. In omphalocele, there is a defect in the development of the anterior abdominal wall.

See also
 Foregut
 Hindgut

References

External links
 
  – "Midgut Volvulus"
 
 Umich.edu – development

Embryology of digestive system